Mangudi is a village in the Annavasalrevenue block of Pudukkottai district, Tamil Nadu, India.

References

Villages in Pudukkottai district